Charlie Jones (2 November 1888 – 24 November 1946) was an  Australian rules footballer who played with South Melbourne in the Victorian Football League (VFL).

Notes

References
 League Football: The South Melbourne Team, The Weekly Times, (Saturday, 13 June 1908), p.25.

External links 

1888 births
1946 deaths
Australian rules footballers from Victoria (Australia)
Sydney Swans players